Caulerpa parvifolia is a species of seaweed in the Caulerpaceae family.

The species is found on sand and rock in the subtidal region in tropical and warmer seas. In Western Australia, it is found along the coast in the Pilbara and as far south as Cape Naturaliste in the South West region it is also found in the Pacific and Indian Oceans.

References

parvifolia
Species described in 1860